Donald's Dilemma is a 1947 Walt Disney Studios animated cartoon directed by Jack King and starring Donald and Daisy Duck. It was originally released on July 11, 1947 in the United States. This short is somewhat of a misnomer. Although Donald is the official headliner for this cartoon, Daisy is the actual protagonist. The dilemma of the title is actually offered to her, not to Donald.

Plot
Daisy narrates her problem to an unseen psychologist through flashback scenes. Her problem started on a spring day when she was out on a date with Donald and a flower pot fell on his head. He regained consciousness soon enough but with some marked differences. His singing voice was improved to the degree in which it sounds identical to Frank Sinatra. However, Donald had no memory of who Daisy was. He became a well-known crooner and his rendition of "When You Wish Upon a Star" from Pinocchio became a hit, which gave him a large number of fans. Daisy's loss resulted in a number of psychological symptoms - she suffered from insomnia, anorexia and self-described insanity. An often censored scene features her losing her will to live and pointing a gun at her head, while in front of a table of other different suicidal methods, including a noose, a grenade, a bomb, a knife, and poison. She decided that she would see Donald once again, at any cost, but failed to do so. That's when she decided to go to the psychologist - and the flashback meets the actual time of the cartoon.

At the end of the cartoon, the psychologist determines that Donald would regain his memory of Daisy if another flower pot (with the same flower from the first pot, which Daisy kept as the only thing she had to remember Donald) would fall on his head. But he warns that his improved voice may be lost along with his singing career. He offers Daisy a dilemma. Either the world has its singer but Daisy loses him or Daisy regains Donald but the world loses him. Posed with the question "her or the world", Daisy answers with a resounding and possessive scream - "Me! Me! Me! MEEE!!". Soon, Donald returns to his old self and forgets about his singing career and Daisy regains her lover.

Voice cast
 Donald Duck: Clarence Nash
 Daisy Duck: Gloria Blondell
 Psychiatrist: Richard Conte
 Singer: Walter Pidgeon
 Audience Members: Margaret Wright And Melvin J. Gibby

Reception
In The Disney Films, Leonard Maltin says that Donald's Dilemma is "perhaps the best Donald Duck of all... a sidesplitting satire of psychological dramas." Maltin provides a number of reasons why he considers this a great cartoon: "Foremost is the fact that it makes the characters and their situation real, even while reminding you that this is a cartoon. The audience actually becomes involved with Daisy's predicament, and there are marvelous little touches to heighten the emotionalism (as when she is climbing to the catwalk near the end and almost loses her step). At the same time the cartoon is filled with hilarious visual exaggeration: when Daisy recalls that Donald gave her a cold icy stare, a long icicle emits from his eyes, and as she waits for Donald at the stage door of the theatre, the seasons change and she is covered with snow. Donald's Dilemma shows how much could be done within the framework of a seven-minute cartoon, using familiar characters; it is a gem."

According to John Howard Reid in Science-Fiction & Fantasy Cinema: Classic Films of Horror, Sci-Fi & the Supernatural, Daisy displays "a ruthlessly self-centered neurotic streak," but maintains the audience's sympathy throughout the film.

Releases
1947 – Theatrical release
1961 – Walt Disney's Wonderful World of Color, episode #8.6: "Inside Donald Duck" (TV)
c. 1983 – Good Morning, Mickey!, episode #42 (TV)
c. 1992 – Mickey's Mouse Tracks, episode #75 (TV)
1998 – The Ink and Paint Club, episode #1.40: "Crazy Over Daisy" (TV)

Home media
The short was released on December 11, 2007 on Walt Disney Treasures: The Chronological Donald, Volume Three: 1947-1950.

Additional releases include:
1984 – Cartoon Classics - Limited Gold Edition: Daisy (VHS)
2005 – Classic Cartoon Favorites: Extreme Music Fun (DVD)

Sources

References

External links
Donald's Dilemma at the Internet Movie Database
Donald Duck's Dilemma at Mickey Mouse Athletics
Disney Archives: Daisy Duck Character History
Donald's Dilemma entry at The Encyclopedia of Disney Animated Shorts

1947 films
1947 animated films
1947 short films
1940s Disney animated short films
Donald Duck short films
American black comedy films
American comedy-drama films
Films directed by Jack King
Films produced by Walt Disney
Films about amnesia
Films about singers
Films scored by Oliver Wallace
Films about suicide
Obscenity controversies in film
Films about depression
Films about ducks